Xenofon Gittas (born 22 June 1979) is a Greek football midfielder who plays for Ethnikos Filippiada.

Career
Born in Ioannina, Gittas has previously played for PAS Giannena, Panathinaikos, Kerkyra, Kallithea, Panthrakikos, AEK Larnaca, Ilioupoli, Rodos, Paniliakos and Doxa Kranoula . The midfielder led Panthrakikos to promotion to the Greek Super League following the 2007–08 season.

References

External links
 
Profile at Onsports.gr
Myplayer.gr Profile

1979 births
Living people
Greek footballers
PAS Giannina F.C. players
Panathinaikos F.C. players
Kallithea F.C. players
A.O. Kerkyra players
Panthrakikos F.C. players
AEK Larnaca FC players
Ilioupoli F.C. players
Rodos F.C. players
Paniliakos F.C. players
Anagennisi Karditsa F.C. players
Cypriot Second Division players
Expatriate footballers in Cyprus
Doxa Kranoula F.C. players
Association football midfielders
Footballers from Ioannina